Eugeniusz Pieniążek (1934-2020) was a Polish pilot and engineer. In 1971 he used an airplane  he constructed himself to escape from People's Republic of Poland, flying to Yugoslavia, from which he emigrated to Sweden.

He died on 7 February 2020.

References 

1934 births
2020 deaths
Polish aviators
Polish engineers
Polish emigrants to Sweden
Polish defectors
1971 in Poland